Stojanov is a Bulgarian and Macedonian surname, often a corresponding to , with feminine form Stojanova. It may refer to:

Alek Stojanov (born 1973), Canadian ice hockey player
Bobby Stojanov Varga (born 1972), Macedonian painter
Darko Stojanov (born 1990), Macedonian footballer
Igor Stojanov (born 1976), Macedonian footballer
Kiro Stojanov (born 1959), Macedonian Roman Catholic Bishop
Nikolai Stojanov (1883–1968), Belarusian-Bulgarian botanist
Panče Stojanov (born 1976), Macedonian footballer
Uroš Stojanov (born 1989), Serbian footballer
Vančo Stojanov (born 1977), Macedonian middle-distance runner

See also
Stoyanov

Macedonian-language surnames
Bulgarian-language surnames